Oxford Historical Monographs is a monographic series published by Oxford University Press. All books published in the series are derived from recent doctoral (D.Phil) theses submitted at the  University of Oxford.

Since the series received its current name in 1965, over 250 titles have been published. Selection of works is done by a committee drawn from the university's history faculty with about 10 percent of theses drawn to their attention being chosen for publication, resulting in 6 to 8 books being published per annum.

References

External links 
Oxford Historical Monographs

Oxford University Press books
Series of history books
1960s books
Monographic series